Pinehurst Historic District may refer to:

Pinehurst Historic District (Tuscaloosa, Alabama), Tuscaloosa County, listed on the National Register of Historic Places (NRHP)
Pinehurst Historic District (Pinehurst, North Carolina), Moore County, NRHP-listed

See also
Pinehurst (disambiguation)